Houston Glacier is a small glacier that drains north from Eielson Peninsula into Smith Inlet, on the east coast of Palmer Land, Antarctica. It was mapped by the United States Geological Survey in 1974, and named by the Advisory Committee on Antarctic Names for Robert B. Houston, U.S. Navy, a radioman at Palmer Station in 1973.

References

Glaciers of Palmer Land